Mountain Union Elementary School District is a public school district based in Shasta County, California, United States.

References

External links
 Official district website

School districts in Shasta County, California